The Jokermobile (also referred to as Joker-Mobile and Joker Mobile) is a specially designed automobile used by DC Comics supervillain Joker. The Jokermobile debuted in Batman #37 (October 1946), and was created by Jerry Robinson.

Publication history

20th century 

The Jokermobile made its comic book debut in Batman #37 (October 1946), in which Joker was fed up with Batman's superior gadgetry that played a role in foiling his criminal plots and so decided to build a series of Joker-themed gadgets, like the Jokermobile, for example, his own themed vehicle, similar to Batman's Batmobile. The vehicle had some features that allowed the Joker to perform feats that not even the Batmobile could, such as creating a plank path to go through chasms and large holes. In addition to being white in color to resemble the Joker's skin, the Jokermobile was equipped with machine guns at the rear and front and was also bulletproof. However, this version of the vehicle was soon deactivated after Batman captured the Joker.

In Batman #52 (April 1949), Joker began using a second Jokermobile, designed as a Silver Arrow race car. Aside from having the Joker's face on the front, it is unknown if this version had any features like its predecessor. In World's Finest Comics #61 (November 1952), the Joker designed a third Jokermobile, which he used to move around Gotham City; he did not use this vehicle for any criminal activities in particular. Shortly afterward, the Joker returned to the first model of the Jokermobile in World's Finest Comics #88 (June 1957), and used it during his alliance with Lex Luthor in Metropolis. In The Joker #4 (December 1975), Joker then used the Jokermobile during his short-lived crime spree in Star City, where he kidnapped Dinah Laurel Lance (the second Black Canary). He was eventually stopped by Green Arrow, who caused the Joker to crash the Jokermobile on the Archway Bridge. The front of the vehicle was damaged, but it could still function. After that, Joker traveled to Wisconsin with the Jokermobile.

After a long period of inactivity, the Joker used his vehicle in Batman #321 (March 1980), to kidnap Commissioner Gordon and lure Batman into a trap. In The Brave and the Bold #191 (October 1982), the Joker then used his vehicle to get Batman's attention and stun him with a giant boxing glove that emerged from the trunk.

21st century 
The Jokermobile was retired in Gotham City Sirens (December 2009), when Joker started dating Harley Quinn. Eventually, he took it out for one last round per Harley's pleading, though it was permanently retired after he shot some teenagers for making fun of him in it.

In the "Joker War" storyline, Joker acquired the codes to the bank accounts of Batman's billionaire alter ego Bruce Wayne, which allowed the villain to steal the hero's fortune and resources, including a fleet of Batmobiles that he converted into Jokermobiles, in turn used by the Joker's henchmen to commit crimes and wreak havoc on Gotham. However, one Jokermobile in particular was used by the Joker for his own personal transport, this being a stretch SUV painted purple and with graffiti around it; Joker described its design as "the most ridiculous thing I've ever seen" before admitting that he loved the vehicle. Unlike previous Jokermobiles, this one was not driven by the Joker, but rather by a private driver, who took him to Ace Chemicals.

In other media

Television 
 Two variants of the Jokermobile are featured in the DC Animated Universe TV shows. The first appears in the Batman: The Animated Series episode "Joker's Wild", where it is displayed in the titular Joker-themed casino. A second variant appears in episodes of The New Batman Adventures, notably "Joker's Millions" and "Beware the Creeper".
 The Jokermobile is a recurring object used by Joker in Batman: The Brave and the Bold.

Films 
 In the 2016 DC Extended Universe film Suicide Squad, the Jokermobile is a light purple custom-built Infiniti G35 with a Vaydor frame modified by the Joker.

Video games 
 The Jokermobile is a playable vehicle in Lego Batman 3: Beyond Gotham and Lego DC Super-Villains.
 A variant of the Jokermobile is featured in Batman: Arkham Knight. During the game's climax, Scarecrow injects Batman with a large dose of his fear toxin, causing the hero to hallucinate that he becomes the Joker and kills his other enemies (including Two-Face, Penguin, and Riddler) using a "Jokerized" version of the Batmobile.
 In Batman: The Enemy Within, the vehicle is a car that "John Doe" steals whilst bringing Bruce Wayne to meet the Pact. If the player's choices influence John to become Vigilante Joker, he transforms the car into the Jokermobile, akin to Batman's Batmobile. In a fight with a Venom-powered Bane, the player can choose to have Batman ram it into him. Later in the episode, he, James Gordon and Tiffany Fox can inspect the Jokermobile for clues to Joker's whereabouts after he kidnaps Amanda Waller.

See also 
 List of fictional cars

References

External links 
 

DC Comics objects
Fictional cars
Fictional elements introduced in 1946
Joker (character)